Islamophobia in China refers to the set of discourses, behaviours and structures which express feelings of anxiety, fear, hostility and rejection towards Islam and/or Muslims in China.

Negative views and attitudes towards Muslims in China are widespread, and some Muslim communities in China face legal restrictions on their ability to practice. Muslim prisoners in detention centers and internment camps have faced Islamophobic practices such as being force-fed pork.

In the 21st century, coverage of Muslims in Chinese media has generally been negative, and Islamophobic content is widespread on Chinese social media. Anti-Muslim attitudes in China have been tied to both narratives regarding historical conflicts between China and Muslim polities as well as contemporary rhetoric related to terrorism in China and abroad.

History 
Recent scholars contend that historical conflicts between the Han Chinese and Muslims like the Northwest Hui Rebellion have been used by some Han Chinese to legitimize and fuel anti-Muslim beliefs and bias in contemporary China. Scholars and researchers have also argued that Western Islamophobia and the  "War on Terror" have contributed to the mainstreaming of anti-Muslim sentiments and practices in China.

It has been reported that Muslims were being forced to eat pork in detention centers and in the Xinjiang internment camps. Since Xi Jinping became General Secretary of the Chinese Communist Party, campaigns against Islam have extended to the Hui people and Utsul community in Hainan.

News coverage 
Traditional media in China were used to be very cautious on the coverage of ethnic issues—particularly Muslim issues, to foster a positive environment both for solidarity among China's different ethnic groups and religions and China's diplomatic relations with Muslim countries. Starting in 2015, hostility towards Muslims and Islam surged after series of terrorist attacks and the emergence of the European refugee crisis. Some observers contend that although negative stereotypes about Muslims have long existed in China, a global rise of Islamophobia, the influence of fake news, and the actions of the Chinese government towards their Muslim minorities have exacerbated Islamophobia in the country.

According to The Washington Post, anti-Muslim sentiment has also been spurred by media segments aired in China, which often portray Muslims as dangerous and prone to terrorism, or as recipients of disproportionate aid from the government.

According to a 2018 study, an analysis of Chinese news reports revealed that coverage of Muslims and Islam was generally negative. The study also revealed that non-Muslim Chinese hold negative views towards Islam and Muslims, and that some Chinese Muslims report discrimination and awareness of negative portrayals of themselves in the media.

Online 
In 2017, journalist Gerry Shih described Islamophobic rhetoric in online social media posts as due to perceived injustices regarding the Muslim minority advantages in college admissions and exemptions from family-size limits. In 2018, a South China Morning Post article similarly described online Islamophobia in China as "becoming increasingly widespread" particularly due to news of institutional preferential treatment for Muslim minorities and news of terrorist attacks in Xinjiang. A 2018 UCSD study of 77,642 posts from Tencent QQ suggested that online Islamophobia was especially concentrated in provinces with higher Muslim populations. An online movement against the spread of halal products in the country has also been reported.

According to Tony Lin of the Columbia Journalism Review, many users utilize popular sites like Weibo and WeChat to spread anti-Muslim fake news taken from western far-right media. He wrote that after the 2019 Christchurch mosque shootings, the most liked comments under Chinese social media posts and various mainstream media sites covering the incident were explicitly anti-Muslim or in support of the shooter.  However, he also wrote that the comments were not representative of the Chinese population. Other articles have reported on the more varied netizen responses to the mosque shootings.

A 2019 study that analysed over 10,000 posts on Weibo relating to Islam and Muslims showed that anti-Muslim sentiment was a common frame surrounding the subject. Active Chinese Muslims users on the site reported to responding to anti-Muslim posts in an attempt to have others understand their lives and faith. Nonetheless, online Muslim users face many challenges owing to a chauvinistic Han discourse and government censorship.

See also 
 History of Islam in China
 History of Xinjiang
 Xinjiang conflict
 Shadian incident
 Xinjiang internment camps
 Uyghur genocide
 Islam in China (1911–present)
 List of Islamophobic incidents in China

Further reading

References 

 
Persecution of Muslims
Religious persecution by communists
Islamophobia in China